Indian Sociological Society (ISS) is a professional body of sociologists in India. It publishes academic research journals, the Sociological Bulletin  in English and the Bhartiya Samajshastra Sameeksha in Hindi language.

History 

In in December 1951, the Indian Sociological Society was registered in Bombay by an initiative of its Founder-President (1951-1966), Prof. G. S. Ghurye, who was then Head of the Department of Sociology at University of Bombay. Prof. J. V. Fereira and Prof. K. M. Kapadia were the founding Secretaries.

Activities

Lifetime Achievement Awards 

From time to time, ISS grants the Lifetime Achievement Award to those who contribute to the advancement in the rigorous research knowledge and research in the field of sociology.

Publication of academic journals 

From March 1952, ISS started publishing a biannual english language academic research journal titled Sociological Bulletin. From January 2014, ISS started publishing a hindi language academic research journal titled Bhartiya Samajshastra Sameeksha.

Seminars 

It occasionally holds seminars/workshops on selected themes of National Importance. For example, its Diamond Jubilee seminar was attended by over 2000 sociologists from several nations across the world, which was inaugurate by the Vice President of India, Hamid Ansari.

See also 

 Indian Council of Social Science Research (ICSSR)
 The Indian Sociologist
 Tata Institute of Social Sciences

References

External links
 official website

Sociological organizations
Organizations established in 1951
Professional associations based in India
Academic journals published in India
Sociology journals